Bunkie may refer to:
Bunkie, Louisiana, a city in Avoyelles Parish, Louisiana, United States
Bunkie station, an historic train station in Bunkie, Louisiana
Semon "Bunkie" Knudsen (1912–1998),  a prominent automobile executive
Bunkie Blackburn (1936–2006), NASCAR racecar driver
Bunkie board, mattress support for a bunk bed

See also
Bunky (disambiguation)
Bunki, an era of Japanese history spanning from 1501 to 1504
Bunkyō, one of the 23 special wards of Tokyo, Japan